(1950 – August 28, 2014) was a Japanese manga artist. He did about 20 series. He died of colorectal cancer.

References

1950 births
2014 deaths
Manga artists
People from Kagoshima